Macrophthalmus dentatus is a species of crab in the family Macrophthalmidae. It was described by Simpson in 1858.

References

Ocypodoidea
Crustaceans described in 1858